6GGG (formerly 6GE) is a commercial radio station in Geraldton, Western Australia which has been broadcasting since 1937. It was once part of the Whitford Radio Network which also included 6PM Perth and 6AM Northam. In the late 1980's, it was part of the Bond Radio Network (owner: Alan Bond) headquartered at Perth's Radio 6PM. In 1991 it converted from 1008 AM to 96.5 FM and changed its callsign to 96.5 GGG-FM as the 2nd commercial FM station in Regional WA after opposition Geraldton station 98FM had launched earlier in 1991. The mid 90s saw 98FM and 96.5 merge into one company. 2005 saw 96.5 relaunch as WAFM as part of the Redwave Media Network.

Former announcers
 Tasma Walton
 Alan Pearsall
 Jeff Newman
 Tony Barber
 Phil Bradshaw
 Lyall Harris (Former station manager)
 Murray Johnson
 John Hubbard
 Rob Fletcher
 Darrell Haimes (Former studio/program manager)
 Rob Buckingham 
 John Harvey
 Jim Campbell
 Perry Vitale
 Chris Lesley
 Ashley Malone (Former station Manager)
 Guy Sweeting (1987) 
 Les Gook (aka: Jay Walker and Lindsay Gook)
 Colin Rowley
 Ivo Lonsdale (Andy Huxton i98FM)
 Clive Murray - (77-78) (85-86) (91-94)

Radio stations in Western Australia